Anni Järvenpää (born 2 January 2000 in Tampere) is a Finnish figure skater. She is the 2016 Finnish senior national champion, and the 2015 Nordics junior silver medalist. She represented Finland at the 2016 Winter Youth Olympics in Lillehammer, Norway, where she placed 13th.

Programs

Results
CS: Challenger Series; JGP: Junior Grand Prix

References

External links
 

Finnish female single skaters
2000 births
Living people
Sportspeople from Tampere
Figure skaters at the 2016 Winter Youth Olympics
21st-century Finnish women